A Walk in the Woods is a 2015 American biographical comedy-drama film directed by Ken Kwapis and starring Robert Redford, Nick Nolte and Emma Thompson. Based on the 1998 book of the same name by Bill Bryson, it was released on September 2, 2015, by Broad Green Pictures.

Plot
After living in the UK for ten years, author Bill Bryson has moved back to his hometown in New Hampshire. Now in his 60s, he has been living there peacefully. A television interview reports that he has published several popular books and there is speculation he will be writing more. Bryson, however, has no such plans.

Bryson and his wife Catherine attend a funeral. Afterwards, he takes a stroll up to the nearby Appalachian Trail, and suddenly decides he will hike its entire length. Catherine objects, presenting many accounts of accidents and murders on the trail. She relents on condition that he not travel alone. He agrees and searches for a friend willing to join him. Everyone declines his invitation; some declare him insane. Finally, he is contacted by Stephen Katz, an old friend who offers to be a hiking companion. Despite appearances, Stephen claims to be fit enough for the challenge. Bill's wife is unhappy with his choice, but relents.

Within less than a mile of their departure point, as groups of hikers overtake and pass them, they begin to grasp the difficulty of their ambition. Shortly after, a group of young children effortlessly runs by them up the trail, laughing and calling out to each other. Seeing others pass by so easily motivates them to carry on. And so they move on, day by day, making more or less pleasant acquaintances, having more or less pleasant experiences.  Some time later they reach a hut, having hiked miserably through pouring rain. Carved into the log wall is an Appalachian Trail map showing the trail and their present location. They realize they have finished less than half of the trail after spending three months on it. Eventually they trek into a restricted section posted "for experienced hikers only". While maneuvering their heavy and awkward backpacks alongside a precipitous drop, Bill trips and pulls Stephen with him down a steep, rocky cliff. They fall about fifteen feet onto a ledge spacious enough to be comfortable, but far enough below the trail to be unable to get back up to resume the hike. They spend the night there with no clear hope of rescue. Luckily, the next day they are awakened by early morning hikers who are able to get them off the ledge.

Eventually, they decide they have had enough and end their journey. When comfortably back at home, Bill, going through his mail, finds a series of post cards from Stephen that were mailed from their various stops along the trail. The last one reads:  "What's next?' Bill sits down and begins typing on his computer, "A WALK IN THE WOODS."

Cast

Production
The project dates back to at least 2005, when Robert Redford first announced his plans to make the film. At various points directors such as Chris Columbus, Barry Levinson and Larry Charles were involved. However, Ken Kwapis ended up directing the picture.

Redford initially wanted Paul Newman to costar in the film with him, to the point where Redford temporarily abandoned the project after Newman's death, feeling no other actor was suitable for the role. However, while directing The Company You Keep, Redford was so impressed by the performance of Nick Nolte that he was eventually cast in the role.

Redford said of the project:

Filming
Principal photography of the film began on May 5, 2014, in Los Angeles. Exterior locations were largely filmed at Amicalola Falls State Park, in Dawsonville, Georgia, including scenes at The Lodge at Amicalola Falls.

Release
The film premiered at the Sundance Film Festival on January 23, 2015. Shortly after, Broad Green Pictures acquired distribution rights to the film, and gave it a wide theatrical release starting September 2, 2015.

Reception
A Walk in the Woods has received mixed reviews from critics. On Rotten Tomatoes, the film holds a rating of 47%, based on 167 reviews, with an average rating of 5.50/10. The site's critical consensus reads, "Amiable yet less compelling than any road trip movie starring Robert Redford and Nick Nolte should be, A Walk in the Woods is ultimately a bit too pedestrian." On Metacritic, the film has a score of 51 out of 100, based on 30 critics, indicating "mixed or average reviews". On CinemaScore, audiences gave the film an average grade of "B" on an A+ to F scale.

References

External links
Official website

2015 films
2010s biographical films
2010s buddy comedy-drama films
2010s road comedy-drama films
2015 comedy-drama films
American biographical films
American buddy comedy-drama films
American road comedy-drama films
Films about friendship
Films about hiking
Films about old age
Films based on non-fiction books
Films about writers
Films directed by Ken Kwapis
Films set in forests
Broad Green Pictures films
Films shot in Georgia (U.S. state)
2015 comedy films
2015 independent films
2010s English-language films
2010s American films